Tshering Bhutia (born 27 November 1995) is an Indian cricketer. He made his first-class debut for Sikkim in the 2018–19 Ranji Trophy on 30 December 2018.

References

External links
 

1995 births
Living people
Indian cricketers
Sikkim cricketers
Place of birth missing (living people)